A number of peaks are named Glass:

United States